The pound (Modern and Middle Scots: Pund) was the currency of Scotland prior to the 1707 Treaty of Union between the Kingdom of Scotland and the Kingdom of England, which created the Kingdom of Great Britain. It was introduced by David I, in the 12th century, on the Carolingian monetary system of a pound divided into 20 shillings, each of 12 pence. The Scottish currency was later devalued relative to sterling by debasement of its coinage. By the time of James III, one pound Scots was valued at five shillings sterling.

Silver coins were issued denominated in merk, worth 13s.4d. Scots (two-thirds of a pound Scots). When James VI became King James I of England in 1603, the coinage was reformed to closely match sterling coin, with £12 Scots equal to £1 sterling. No gold coinage was issued from 1638 to 1700, but new silver coinage was issued from 1664 to 1707.

With the Acts of Union 1707, the pound Scots was replaced by sterling coin at the rate of 12:1 (£1 Scots = 1s.8d. stg), although the pound Scots continued to be used in Scotland as a unit of account for most of the 18th century.

Today there is no distinct Scots currency; but Scotland's three largest clearing banks (the Royal Bank of Scotland, the Bank of Scotland and the Clydesdale Bank) issue banknotes denominated in sterling. These notes may be accepted as payment throughout the United Kingdom, but are much more commonly seen in Scotland; their value is backed by non-circulating large denomination notes issued by the Bank of England (the "giants" and "titans").

List of coins of the pound Scots
 Pistole – Gold, 12 pounds Scots
 Dollar – Replacement for the ryal, 60 shillings Scots (James VI)
 Ryal – Gold, 1565
 Crown or Lion – Gold (James I)
 Half-crown, Demi-Lion or Demys – Gold (James I)
 Ducat or "bonnet" – 40 shillings, 1539 (James V)
 Mark or merk – Gold (giving rise to the term markland)
 Noble – Gold, worth half a mark, 1357 (David II, reintroduced by Robert III)
 Unicorn – Gold, 18 shillings Scots, 1484–85 (James III)
 Half-unicorn – Gold, 9 shillings Scots (James IV)
 Testoun – silver, 1553. Was produced in France with the new process of mill and screw, being the first milled coinage of Scotland.
 Bawbee – Billon, six pence from 1537
 Shilling
 Groat – Silver, equivalent to four pence, from 1357 (giving rise to the term groatland)
 Half-groat – Silver, equivalent to two pence, from 1357
 Turner – Billon, two pence (James VI), later copper.
 Bodle – Copper, two pence (Charles II)
 Hardhead – also called Lion, billon coin circulated in the reigns of Mary and James VI
 Penny – Billon, one of the earliest coins, dating from David I. Later made of copper, giving rise to the term pennyland.
 Halfpennies – Initially literally half of a penny, these became minted coins in their own right in c.1280. Later made of copper.
 Farthing or quarter-penny – These were originally quarters of pennies, but as with Halfpennies, became coins in their own right in c.1280. Later made of copper.
 Plack – value of four pence Scots or by 1707 one-third of a penny sterling.

See also

Banknotes of Scotland (modern Sterling banknotes)
Scottish coinage
Penny Scots
Merk (coin)

Testoon (English shilling)
 (Robbie Burns poem)

References

Currencies of Scotland
Economic history of Scotland
Coins of Scotland
12th-century establishments in Scotland
1707 disestablishments in Scotland
Medieval currencies